Pyin Oo Lwin or Pyin U Lwin, formerly and colloquially referred to as Maymyo, is a scenic hill town in the Mandalay Region, Myanmar, some  east of Mandalay, and at an elevation of . The town was estimated to have a population of around 255,000 in 2014.

Etymology

Pyin Oo Lwin (ပြင်ဦးလွင်‌)
Maymyo (မေမြို့)

Taung Hlay Khar (တောင်လှေခါး) ('hillside stairs')
Taung Sa Kan (တောင်စခန်း) ('hill station') and the best-known name, Pan Myo Taw ('city of flowers)
 Remyo (historically)

History

The town began as a military outpost established near a small Shan village with two dozen households on the Lashio-Mandalay trail between Nawnghkio and Mandalay. In 1897, a permanent military post was established in the town and later, because of its climate, it became a hill station and the summer capital of British Burma. The establishment in Burma (civil, commercial and military) would move to Maymyo during the hot season to escape from Rangoon's high heat and humidity. During British rule and through the 1970s, Maymyo had a large Anglo-Burmese population, but this steadily declined. During the Japanese occupation, as many Anglos were concentrated in and around Maymyo, the Japanese incarcerated many of them for fear of their loyalty to the British very close to Maymyo. Today, Maymyo still has one of the country's larger populations of Anglo-Burmese. The British named the location Maymyo, literally 'May's Town' in Burmese, after Colonel May, a veteran of the Indian Rebellion of 1857 and commander of the Bengal Regiment temporarily stationed in the town in 1887. The military government of Burma renamed the town Pyin U Lwin, the word-for-word Burmese transcription of the Shan "City (ဝဵင်း, Weng⁴) of Paang²uu⁴ (ပၢင်ႇဢူး)".

The area is also the site of the decisive battle of Maymyo where the Burmese royal army under Maha Thiha Thura defeated the Chinese Army in the third invasion during the Sino-Burmese War of 1765–1769.

Demographics
The town has approximately 10,000 Indian and 8,000 Gurkha inhabitants who settled in Maymyo during British rule. Today, Pyin Oo Lwin has a thriving Eurasian community, consisting mostly of Anglo-Burmese and Anglo-Indians. There is also a diverse mix of Chinese, Chin, Kachin, Karen, Shan, Bamars (Burmese) and communities.

Climate

Educational institutions
Maymyo was an important educational centre during colonial times, with the GEHSs (Government English High Schools), such as St. Mary's, St. Michael's, St. Albert's, St. Joseph's Convent, and Colgate, are all based in the town. British settlers and colonial administrators sent their children to be educated here, both European and Anglo-Burmese children. The town was also the location of the various schools of military education open to all ethnicities.

It is today home to the Defence Services Academy (DSA) and the Defence Services Technological Academy (DSTA). There is a large military presence in the town.
Nowadays private schools such as Soe San, Sar Pan Eain, Genius and others are thriving.

Economy

Sweater knitting, flower and vegetable gardens, strawberry and pineapple orchards, coffee plantations and cow rearing are the main local businesses. There has been an influx of Chinese immigrants (especially from Yunnan) in recent years. The city is a resort town for visitors from Myanmar's major cities during the summertime and a popular stop for foreign tourists during the winter season.

Established in 1915, the National Botanical Gardens and the adjacent Pyin Oo Lwin Nursery are attractions of Pyin Oo Lwin. A  orchid garden is planned for 2007.

Today, Pyin Oo Lwin is noted as four centres of national economic importance. It is the centre of sericulture (silkworm rearing). The Sericulture Research Centre, near the National Kandawgyi Botanical Gardens, has three distinct roles: the intensive planting and harvesting of mulberry trees (leaves for the silkworms, bark for handmade paper), the rearing of silkworms, and the reeling of the silk from the cocoons. It has a large research centre for indigenous medicinal plants. It has one of the country's few pharmaceutical production facilities.

Pyin Oo Lwin is the centre of the country's flower and vegetable production. The most important flowers grown intensively are chrysanthemum, aster and gladiolus, which are exported to every corner of Myanmar throughout the year. Lastly, Pyin Oo Lwin is the centre of Myanmar's rapidly growing coffee industry.  Several factories in the town process coffee beans for country-wide distribution and export.

Notable people
 Aung Min Thein (1961–2007), Burmese film director and artist
 Eric Arthur Blair better known by his pen name George Orwell Author, stationed in Maymyo 1922-1927
 Alan Basil de Lastic (24 September 1929 – 20 June 2000), prominent Catholic (Latin Rite) clergyman in India
Haji U Thein - Chairman, Islamic Religious Affairs Council of Myanmar
Hteit Tin Ma Latt - a grandchild of Prince Kanaung
 Prince Taw Phaya (22 March 1924 – 12 January 2019) - the oldest grandson of King Thibaw Min, the last King of Burma.
Thakhin Ohn Pe
Ma Chit Po (February 1908 – 8 April 1949), the only woman to be awarded the Thura Medal
B. G. Verghese (21 June 1926 - 30 December 2014) was a senior Indian journalist born in Maymyo. He was editor of leading newspapers the Hindustan Times (1969–75) and The Indian Express (1982–86). In 1975, he received the Ramon Magsaysay Award for his outstanding contribution to journalism. After 1986, he was associated with the New Delhi think-tank Centre for Policy Research.

References

External links

 
 Pyin Oo Lwin: Myanmar's Highland City of Flowers pyinoolwin.info
 "Maymyo, Burma" Maplandia.com

 Populated places in Mandalay Region
 Hill stations in Myanmar
 Township capitals of Myanmar
 Shan Hills